Tina Hirsch (born 1943)—also known as Bettina Kugel Hirsch, Bettina Hirsch, and Bettina Kugel—is an American film editor and an adjunct professor of editing at the University of Southern California.

Tina Hirsch began to edit films in the late 1960s, serving as an assistant editor on Woodstock (1970) and Hi, Mom! (1970). She edited several films for New World Pictures including Death Race 2000 (1975) and Eat My Dust (1976). She advanced to editing major studio films, including the sequels More American Graffiti (1979) and Airplane II: The Sequel (1982). In the '80s, she was a regular editor for New World Pictures alumnus Joe Dante's films, including the It's a Good Life sequence in Twilight Zone: The Movie (1983) as well as Gremlins (1984) and Explorers (1985). Hirsch would later direct Munchies (1987) for New World's founder Roger Corman, one of the many low-budget movies that were imitative of Dante's Gremlins.

Hirsch edited episodes of the television series The West Wing (A Proportional Response, 1999, and What Kind of Day Has It Been, 2000), for which she was nominated for an Emmy for "Outstanding Single Camera Picture Editing for a Series" and for which she also won an Eddie award from the American Cinema Editors. In 2005, she was nominated for a second Emmy for editing the television miniseries Back When We Were Grownups (2004).

She has been elected to membership in the American Cinema Editors, and she was the first female president of the honorary society. Hirsch currently serves on the board of ACE, and has done so for more than two decades.

Since 2003, Hirsch has spent her time working as adjunct professor of editing at USC film school.

References

External links

Kowalski, Eileen (2001). "Tina Hirsch", Variety November 14, 2001; online version retrieved July 7, 2008.

1943 births
Living people
American film editors
American Cinema Editors
American women film editors
21st-century American women